The 1984 Copa Fraternidad was the 14th edition of the Central American football club championship organized by UNCAF, the regional governing body of Central America.  This was the last tournament under the name Copa Fraternidad.

The final round was scheduled to be played between the group winners, however, the tournament was abandoned and no team was proclaimed champions.

Teams
Only El Salvador and Guatemala sent representatives.

Group I

Group II

Group III

Final Round
Scheduled to be played between Independiente F.C., C.D. Suchitepéquez and Aurora F.C.  The tournament was abandoned and not finished.

References

1984
1
1983–84 in Salvadoran football
1983–84 in Guatemalan football